List of Republic of Poland's ambassadors registered in other countries, including those having dual accreditation (Ambassadors at Large). List updated on 17 March 2023.

Current Polish Ambassadors 
Source

International organisations

See also

List of ambassadors to Poland

References

Sources

Polish diplomatic missions abroad

 
Poland